Charlier is a lunar impact crater that is located on the far side of the Moon. To the south-southeast is the larger crater Kovalevskaya, and northeast of Charlier is Perrine.

This is an eroded crater formation with a damaged outer rim. The most intact section of the rim is along the northeast quadrant; the rim to the south and west has been eroded and partly covered by small craters. The western part of the rim is overlaid by a merged cluster of multiple small impacts.

The interior floor has also not escaped the bombardment, and multiple small craters lie across the interior, in some places overlapping previous impacts. There are two patches of the interior floor that are relatively free from notable impacts. One is adjacent to the northern part of the interior floor and the other is in the southwest part of the floor.

Satellite craters
By convention these features are identified on lunar maps by placing the letter on the side of the crater midpoint that is closest to Charlier.

References

 
 
 
 
 
 
 
 
 
 
 
 

Impact craters on the Moon